The 2006/07 NTFL season was the 86th season of the Northern Territory Football League (NTFL).

Southern Districts Crocs have won there 2nd premiership title while defeating Waratah in the grand final by 9 points.

Grand Final

References

Northern Territory Football League seasons
NTFL